Arsenal Military Academy is a 2019 Chinese streaming television series, directed by Hue Kaidong, with the script written by Princess Agents author Xiao Xiang Dong Er. It originally airs 2 episodes daily on iQiyi, Tuesday through Friday at 20:00, and stars Bai Lu, Xu Kai, Li Chengbin and Wu Jiayi. The drama tells the story of Xie Xiang, who disguises herself as a male student to join the military academy under her brother's name.

Synopsis 
Hoping to follow in her deceased brother's footsteps, Xie Xiang (Bai Lu) enrolls into the Arsenal Military Academy in Shunyuan disguised as a male, with only her good friend Tan Xiaojun (Zhang Xin) knowing her secret. There, she becomes good friends with the country bumpkin Huang Song (Liu Sibo) and the quiet Shen Junsan (Li Chengbin), all while getting into periodic quarrels with her hot-headed and playful roommate, Gu Yanzheng (Xu Kai). Despite her small stature and weak constitution, she gradually trains into an able soldier, winning the respect of her peers.

These students soon uncover a dangerous conspiracy surrounding the Japanese occupiers, the Chinese resistance, as well as past royal descendants of the now defunct Qing dynasty.

Cast 

Main characters
 Bai Lu as Xie Xiang
 Xu Kai as Gu Yanzhen
 Li Chengbin as Shen Junshan
 Wu Jiayi as Qu Manting

Arsenal Military Academy
 Liu Runnan as Li Wenzhong
 Wang Yizhe as Ji Jin
 Liu Sibo as Huang Song
 Meng En as Zhu Yanlin
 Shao Bing as Guo Shuting
 Lin Yo-wei as Lu Zhongyu

Other characters
 Gao Yuer as Jin Xianrong/Oda Hiroshi
 Li Ang as Song Xicheng
 Hong Yao as Shen Tingbai
 Sun Tao as Huang Jingli
 Dong Li as Xie Liangchen
 Zhang Xin as Tan Xiaojun
 Yin Zheng as Chengrui Beilei
 An Yuexi as An Wen
 Liu Min as Huo Xiaoyu
 Zuo Xiaoqing as Pei Nianqing
 Liu Enshang as Sato Kazuo
 Zhang Yixi as Gu Qiqi
 He Jiayi as Mrs. Qu
 Li Jie as Mr. Qu
 Sun Anke as Qu Manshu
 Lu Ling as Mrs. Xie
 Zhang Gong as Mr. Xie Zhipei 
 Ren Shan as Gu Zongtang
 Fang Anna as Sister Huang 
 Li Qinqin as Fu Jin
 Xiao Rongsheng as Zhang Siling
 Xuan Lu as Bai Biyun

Soundtrack

Production 
Filming began on March 26, 2018, at Hengdian Studios and Zhejiang Province. Filming finished and officially entered post-production on August 6 of the same year.

Awards and nominations

References

External links 
  Arsenal Military Academy on Weibo

Chinese period television series
Chinese espionage television series
Chinese romance television series
2019 Chinese television series debuts
2019 Chinese television series endings
Television series by Huanyu Film
Mandarin-language television shows
Chinese web series
IQIYI original programming
Television series by Tencent Pictures